see False confession (legal) for more

False Confession is an American hardcore punk band, that formed in the early 1980s in the Oxnard, California, area. They are one of the founding members of the "Nardcore" punk movement.

Their first 7-inch EP Left to Burn was released by Mystic Records in 1984.  The tracks included:
 Left To Burn
 Feline
 Scared
 Our Savior
 Just As I Am
 Lies

They were also featured on the Nardcore Compilation LP.

One of the members, Scotty Morris, went on to form the swing band Big Bad Voodoo Daddy many years later. Another member, Harry, joined The Cramps as Harry Drumdini from January 1994 to August 2003.

In June 2012, the band performed a reunion show and announced their return with almost the entire original lineup of Israel, Harry, Fred, and new bass player Ismael. Scotty Morris has too much of a full schedule with Big Bad Voodoo Daddy to return to the band at this time.

Members
Original lineup:
Israel Madlangbayan(sic) - Vocals
Harry Misenheimer - Drums
Fred Matatquin - Guitar
Scott Morris - Bass

Current lineup:
Israel M. - Lead Vocals
Harry M. - Lead Drums
Ismael H. - Lead Bass 
Fred M. - Lead Guitar

False Confession discography
Nardcore Compilation LP, Mystic Records 1984
Left to Burn 7-inch, Mystic 1984
Covers, Compilation LP, Mystic 1985
Mystic Super Seven Sampler No. 1, Compilation 7-inch, Mystic 1985
Let's Die, Compilation,  Mystic 1985
Out of the Basement Demo 1983 LP, Queer Pills 2013

References
 www.killfromtheheart.com - Punk Rock Musical history website's False Confession info page

Hardcore punk groups from California
Musicians from Oxnard, California